The 2012–13 Bethune–Cookman Wildcats men's basketball team represented Bethune–Cookman University during the 2012–13 NCAA Division I men's basketball season. The Wildcats, led by second year head coach Gravelle Craig, played their home games at the Moore Gymnasium and were members of the Mid-Eastern Athletic Conference. They finished the season 14–20, 7–9 in MEAC play to finish in eighth place. They advanced to the semifinals of the MEAC tournament where they lost to Morgan State.

Roster

Schedule

|-
!colspan=9| Exhibition

|-
!colspan=9| Regular season

|-
!colspan=9| 2013 MEAC men's basketball tournament

References

Bethune–Cookman Wildcats men's basketball seasons
Bethune-Cookman
Bethune-Cookman Wildcats men's basketball
Bethune-Cookman Wildcats men's basketball